Taraxella is a genus of Southeast Asian jumping spiders that was first described by F. R. Wanless in 1984.

Species
 it contains five species, found only in Indonesia and Malaysia:
Taraxella hillyardi Wanless, 1987 – Malaysia
Taraxella petrensis Wanless, 1987 – Indonesia (Sumatra)
Taraxella reinholdae Wanless, 1987 – Borneo
Taraxella solitaria Wanless, 1984 (type) – Borneo
Taraxella sumatrana Wanless, 1987 – Indonesia (Sumatra)

References

Salticidae genera
Salticidae
Spiders of Asia